Africalpe nubifera is a moth of the family Erebidae first described by George Hampson in 1907. It is found in India.

References

Calpinae
Moths of Asia
Moths described in 1907
Taxa named by George Hampson